Graceville can refer to:

Australia
Graceville, Queensland, a suburb of Brisbane
Graceville railway station, Brisbane
Graceville Memorial Park
Graceville Uniting Church

United States
Graceville, Florida
Graceville, Minnesota
Graceville Township, Big Stone County, Minnesota